Rock @ Roll is the seventh album by the Croatian rock band Aerodrom, released through Croatia Records in 2007. The album marked the band's 30th anniversary, which they celebrated at a New Year's Eve concert in Ban Jelačić Square in Zagreb. Jurica Pađen wrote all of the music and lyrics, except for "Fait Accompli", a song co-written with Branimir Štulić and dedicated to John Lennon. Rock @ Roll was recorded as a trio with new drummer Slavko Pintarić 'Pišta'. The album included four new singles, "Mili moj anđele", "Tvoj pas me čudno gleda", "Kći starog vodeničara" and "Odma mi je zapela za oko".

Track listing
All music and lyrics written by Jurica Pađen, except track 12 music by Jurica Pađen and Branimir Štulić, all arrangements by Aerodrom.

Personnel 
Aerodrom
Jurica Pađen – Guitars, lead vocals
Tomislav Šojat – Bass, backup vocals
Slavko Pintarić 'Pišta' – Drums

Additional musicians
Zlatan Živković - Keyboards
Zlatan Došlić - Keyboards
Zdravko Tabain - Drums in track 10

Artwork
Igor 'CC' Kelčec - Photography and design

Production
Jurica Pađen – Producer
Tomislav Šojat - Producer
Dragutin Smokrović 'Smokva' - Producer
Recorded by Dragutin Smokrović 'Smokva'

References

External links
 Official Youtube channel

Aerodrom (band) albums
2007 albums
Croatia Records albums